Tiruvusaattaanam Mandirapureeswarar Temple
is a Hindu temple located at Kovilur in Tiruvarur district, Tamil Nadu, India. The temple is dedicated to Shiva, as the moolavar presiding deity, in his manifestation as Mandirapureeswsarar. His consort, Parvati, is known as Periyanayaki.

Significance 
It is one of the shrines of the 275 Paadal Petra Sthalams - Shiva Sthalams glorified in the early medieval Tevaram poems by Tamil Saivite Nayanar Tirugnanasambandar.

References

External links 
 
 

Shiva temples in Tiruvarur district
Padal Petra Stalam